City of Wolverhampton Council elections are held three years out of every four, with a third of the council elected each time. City of Wolverhampton Council is the local authority for the metropolitan borough of Wolverhampton in the West Midlands, England. Since the last boundary changes in 2004, 60 councillors have been elected from 20 wards.

Political control
From 1889 to 1974 Wolverhampton was a county borough, independent of any county council. Under the Local Government Act 1972 it had its territory enlarged and became a metropolitan borough, with West Midlands County Council providing county-level services. The first election to the reconstituted borough council was held in 1973, initially operating as a shadow authority before coming into its revised powers on 1 April 1974. West Midlands County Council was abolished in 1986 and Wolverhampton became a unitary authority. Wolverhampton was awarded city status on 31 January 2001. Political control of the council since 1974 has been held by the following parties:

Leadership
The leaders of the council since 1974 have been:

Council elections
 1973 Wolverhampton Metropolitan Borough Council election
 1975 Wolverhampton Metropolitan Borough Council election
 1976 Wolverhampton Metropolitan Borough Council election
 1978 Wolverhampton Metropolitan Borough Council election
 1979 Wolverhampton Metropolitan Borough Council election
 1980 Wolverhampton Metropolitan Borough Council election
 1982 Wolverhampton Metropolitan Borough Council election
 1983 Wolverhampton Metropolitan Borough Council election
 1984 Wolverhampton Metropolitan Borough Council election
 1986 Wolverhampton Metropolitan Borough Council election
 1987 Wolverhampton Metropolitan Borough Council election
 1988 Wolverhampton Metropolitan Borough Council election
 1990 Wolverhampton Metropolitan Borough Council election
 1991 Wolverhampton Metropolitan Borough Council election
 1992 Wolverhampton Metropolitan Borough Council election
 1994 Wolverhampton Metropolitan Borough Council election
 1995 Wolverhampton Metropolitan Borough Council election
 1996 Wolverhampton Metropolitan Borough Council election
 1998 Wolverhampton Metropolitan Borough Council election
 1999 Wolverhampton Metropolitan Borough Council election
 2000 Wolverhampton Metropolitan Borough Council election
 2002 Wolverhampton City Council election
 2003 Wolverhampton City Council election
 2004 Wolverhampton City Council election (new ward boundaries)
 2006 Wolverhampton City Council election
 2007 Wolverhampton City Council election
 2008 Wolverhampton City Council election
 2010 Wolverhampton City Council election
 2011 Wolverhampton City Council election
 2012 Wolverhampton City Council election
 2014 Wolverhampton City Council election
 2015 Wolverhampton City Council election
 2016 City of Wolverhampton Council election
 2018 City of Wolverhampton Council election
 2019 City of Wolverhampton Council election
 2021 City of Wolverhampton Council election
 2022 City of Wolverhampton Council election

Borough result maps

By-election results

1990–1999

2000–2009

2010–2019

2020–onwards

References

 Wolverhampton election results
 By-election results

External links
City of Wolverhampton Council

 
Elections in Wolverhampton
Council elections in the West Midlands (county)
Wolverhampton